Edward Bailey (1814–1903) was the most accomplished of the Hawaiian missionary period artists in Hawaii.  Along with his wife Caroline Hubbard, Bailey arrived in Hawaii as a missionary-teacher in 1837 on the ship Mary Frazier.  He worked at the Wailuku Female Seminary in Maui from 1840 until its closure in 1849.  After the seminary closed, he helped build the still standing Ka'ahumanu Church in Wailuku and operated a small sugarcane plantation that eventually became part of the Wailuku Sugar Company. Bailey's early works were sketches and drawings which were engraved by students at the Lahainaluna Seminary between 1833 and 1843. He began painting about 1865, at the age of 51, without any formal instruction.

Bailey's best known paintings are landscapes depicting the natural beauty of central Maui.  The Bailey House Museum (Wailuku, Hawaii) and the Lyman House Memorial Museum (Hilo, Hawaii) are among the public collections holding works by Edward Bailey.

References
 Forbes, David W., Encounters with Paradise: Views of Hawaii and its People, 1778-1941, Honolulu Academy of Arts, 1992, pp. 86–7, 95, 160-1.
, p. 56
 Severson, Don R., Finding Paradise: Island Art in Private Collections, University of Hawaii Press, 2002, pp. 74–5, 138.

External links
 The Bailey House Museum
 Edward Bailey in AskArt.com
 Smithsonian American Art Museum, Art Inventories Catalog

Footnotes

1814 births
1903 deaths
People from Hawaii
Painters from Hawaii
People from Holden, Massachusetts
19th-century American painters
American male painters
People from Wailuku, Hawaii
Congregationalist missionaries in Hawaii
19th-century American male artists